Sagacity is the twenty-first studio album by Canadian rock band Saga. New drummer, Mike Thorne made his debut on this album.

The album title Sagacity is a play on words. Sagacity (the noun) means "The quality of being discerning, sound in judgment, and farsighted; wisdom".

Upon release, Sagacity charted #17 in Germany. A "Special Edition" was also released, containing 9 tracks recorded live at SWR1 Rock Arena during their 2013 tour.

Track listing
All songs written by Saga.

Credits
Michael Sadler – lead vocals
Ian Crichton – guitars
Jim Gilmour – keyboards, backing vocals
Jim Crichton – bass, keyboards
Mike Thorne – drums, backing vocals

References

2014 albums
Saga (band) albums